Victor Bass Forsyth Gordon (9 November 1890 – 11 August 1981) was an Australian rules footballer who played with St Kilda, Melbourne and Carlton in the Victorian Football League (VFL).

Notes

External links 

Vic Gordon's profile at Blueseum

1890 births
1981 deaths
Australian rules footballers from Melbourne
St Kilda Football Club players
Melbourne Football Club players
Carlton Football Club players
Hawthorn Football Club (VFA) players
People from Oakleigh, Victoria